The 1946–47 Oberliga  was the second season of the Oberliga, the first tier of the football league system in Allied-occupied Germany. The league operated in four regional divisions, Berlin, South and Southwest (north and south). For the third consecutive season no German championship was held but the competition would resume the following year with 1. FC Nürnberg taking out the first post-war championship.

In the British and Soviet occupation zone no Oberligas were organised. In the former the Oberliga Nord and Oberliga West commenced play in the following season while, in the Soviet zone, the DDR-Oberliga was organised from 1949 onwards. In the Soviet zone a championship was organised from the following season, while the first edition of the British occupation zone championship in 1947 was contested by eight teams and won by Hamburger SV.

In the French occupation zone the Oberliga Südwest operated in two regional divisions, north and south, with a championship final at the end of season.

In post-Second World War Germany many clubs were forced to change their names or merge. This policy was particularly strongly enforced in the Soviet and French occupation zones but much more relaxed in the British and US one. In most cases clubs eventually reverted to their original names, especially after the formation of the Federal Republic of Germany in 1949.

Oberliga Berlin
The 1946–47 season saw the league reduced from four divisions of nine clubs each to a single division of twelve clubs.

Oberliga Südwest

Northern group
The 1946–47 season saw two new clubs promoted to the league, TuS Neuendorf and FSV Kürenz.

Southern group
The 1946–47 season saw four new clubs promoted to the league, SSV Reutlingen, SG Friedrichshafen, VfL Schwenningen and SV Biberach.

Finals
The winners of the two regional divisions of the Oberliga Südwest played a final to determine the league champion:

|}

Oberliga Süd
The 1946–47 season saw four new clubs promoted to the league, Viktoria Aschaffenburg, VfL Neckarau, 1. FC Bamberg and TSG Ulm 1846.

German championship
No 1947 German championship was held but attempts were made to stage one, scheduled to consist of eight teams, three each from the US and British zone and one each from the French and Soviet one. Difficulties with the scheduling resulted in a reduced format of only four teams planned to consist of Hamburger SV playing SG Charlottenburg and 1. FC Nürnberg playing 1. FC Kaiserslautern in the semi-finals on 10 August 1947, with the final planned for 24 August 1947. After the southern clubs declined to participate the competition was cancelled altogether.

References

Sources
 30 Jahre Bundesliga  30th anniversary special, publisher: kicker Sportmagazin, published: 1993
 kicker-Almanach 1990  Yearbook of German football, publisher: kicker Sportmagazin, published: 1989, 
 DSFS Liga-Chronik seit 1945  publisher: DSFS, published: 2005
 100 Jahre Süddeutscher Fußball-Verband  100 Years of the Southern German Football Federation, publisher: SFV, published: 1997

External links
 The Oberligas on Fussballdaten.de 

1946-47
1
Ger